Oppenheimer is a surname. Notable people with the surname include:

In arts and media
 Alan Oppenheimer (born 1930), American film actor
 Andrés Oppenheimer (born 1951), Argentine author and journalist known for his analysis of Latin American politics
 Jerry Oppenheimer, American biographer
 Jess Oppenheimer (1913–1988), American radio and television writer, producer, and director, creator of I Love Lucy
 Joel Oppenheimer (1930–1988), American writer
 Joshua Oppenheimer (born 1974), American film director
 Lillian Oppenheimer (1898–1992), American origami pioneer
 Max Oppenheimer (1885–1954), Austrian painter and graphic artist
 Stephen Oppenheimer (born 1947), British paediatrician, geneticist, and writer on genetics and human prehistory

In business

Minerals
 Bernard Oppenheimer (1866–1921), South African and British diamond merchant and philanthropist, brother of Ernest
 Ernest Oppenheimer (1880–1957), diamond and gold mining entrepreneur and financier; controlled De Beers and founded the Anglo American Corporation of South Africa, brother of Bernard
 Harry Frederick Oppenheimer (1908–2000), South African businessman of De Beers Consolidated Mines Limited, son of Ernest
 Nicky Oppenheimer (born 1945), chairman of De Beers and of The Diamond Trading Company, son of Harry

Other businesses
 Damon Oppenheimer (born 1962), Vice President and Director of Amateur Scouting for the New York Yankees
 Joseph Süß Oppenheimer (1698–1738), financial adviser to Karl Alexander, Duke of Württemberg
 Samuel Oppenheimer (1635–1703), Jewish banker
 Peter Oppenheimer, American business executive, first CFO of Apple Inc

In government and law
 Charles Cuprill Oppenheimer (1916–2011), lawyer and Rotary District Governor for Puerto Rico
 David Oppenheimer (1834–1897), second mayor of Vancouver, British Columbia, Canada
 Kay Oppenheimer, member of the New Hampshire House of Representatives
 Santiago Oppenheimer (1869 – ca. 1930), mayor of Ponce, Puerto Rico, in 1906
 Suzi Oppenheimer (born 1934), New York politician

In science and academia
Clive Oppenheimer (born 1964), British volcanologist
 Daniel M. Oppenheimer, American professor of psychology at UCLA
 Frank Oppenheimer (1912–1985), American physicist, brother of J. Robert Oppenheimer, founder of the Exploratorium in San Francisco
 Franz Oppenheimer (1864–1943), German sociologist and political economist
 Hillel Oppenheimer (1899–1971), Israeli professor of botany, son of Franz
 Jane M. Oppenheimer (1911–1996), American embryologist and historian of science
 J. Robert Oppenheimer (1904–1967), American physicist who headed the Manhattan Project, known as the "Father of the Atomic Bomb"
 Katherine Oppenheimer (1910–1972), German-American biologist, wife of J. Robert Oppenheimer
 Michael Oppenheimer, American professor of geosciences at Princeton University, authority on climate change
 Rebecca Oppenheimer (born 1972), American astrophysicist
 Stephen Oppenheimer (born 1947), British popular science writer in prehistory

In other fields
 Damon Oppenheimer (born 1962), Vice President and Director of Amateur Scouting for the New York Yankees
 David Oppenheim (rabbi) (1664–1736), also called Oppenheimer, rabbi of Prague and bibliophile
 Isabel la Negra (1901–1974), also known as Isabel Luberza Oppenheimer, Puerto Rican criminal
 Joseph Oppenheimer (1820–1893), German-British businessman and inventor of telegraphic equipment
 Josh Oppenheimer (born 1970), Israeli-American basketball coach, and former basketball player
 Thomas Oppenheimer (born 1988), German ice hockey player

See also
 Oppenheim (disambiguation)

German-language surnames
Jewish surnames